

Life
Mr. Winkle was rescued as a stray in Bakersfield, California by Lara Jo Regan, a magazine photographer who remained his owner until the dog's death. She has published numerous calendars, books and cards published featuring photos of Mr. Winkle in various settings, costumes and poses.

After a long retirement, Mr. Winkle died of kidney failure in November 2017. His exact age is not known because he was a rescued stray of unknown origins.

In media
Mr. Winkle was the subject of many national and international newspaper and magazine articles, and appeared on various television shows including the September 1, 2002 episode of Sex and the City. Regan's book tours with Mr. Winkle from 2001–2005 often drew over 500 fans at each location, inspiring the producer of Sex and the City to incorporate him into an episode where he upstages the character Carrie Bradshaw at her first book signing.

Mr. Winkle appeared on the cover of many magazines including Pet Life, Animal Wellness and Time for Kids.  Time also named Mr. Winkle "Best Internet Celebrity of 2002" in their online supplement "On". By 2006, mrwinkle.com had garnered over 65 million hits. Mr. Winkle came to be known as the first animal celebrity meme whose fame was sparked by internet culture. By 2009, Regan had created over 150 "What is Mr. Winkle" photographic characters as well as an extensive fine art series of her muse, collected in the form of published works and art prints. A major museum retrospective of Regan's Mr. Winkle photographs took place July 7, 2012 to October 7, 2012 at the Utah Museum of Contemporary Art in Salt Lake City.

Bibliography
What is Mr. Winkle? (2001–2009)
Winkle's World (2002–2005)
A Winkle in Time (2004–2007)
Mr. Winkle: The Complete Character Collection (2012)

See also
 List of individual dogs

References

External links
http://www.mrwinkle.com/

2017 animal deaths
Individual dogs